Callistocythere is a genus of ostracods. Some species are known from the fossil record.

See also 
 List of prehistoric ostracod genera

References 

Podocopida genera